Mayada is the given name of

 Mayada El Hennawy (born 1959), Syrian and pan-Arab singer
 Mayada Al-Sayad (born 1992), German-Palestinian marathon runner
 Mayada Swar Aldahab, Sudanese politician

Mayada is the family name of

 Camilo Mayada (born 1991), Uruguayan footballer